Lawrence Van Buskirk (June 21, 1867 - November 21, 1910) was mayor of Bloomington, Indiana for eight years in the late 19th century.  He was also postmaster and a bank president.

Education and career

He graduated from Indiana University, having studied philosophy and law, and studied law degree one year at University of Michigan Law School in Ann Arbor, Michigan, having to withdraw due to ill health. He was, though, reported by the Royal Arch Masons of Indiana to have been admitted to the bar. Buskirk was mayor of the city for eight years,  postmaster, and president of the First National Bank in Bloomington, Indiana. At the time of his death, he was treasurer at Indiana University.

Personal life
Born in Bloomington on June 21, 1867, he was the son of George A. Buskirk and Martha A. (née Hardesty) Buskirk. His uncle was Samuel Hamilton Buskirk. Van Buskirk had four siblings, George, Phillip, Martha, and a sister who married Nat U. Hill, Sr. On April 22, 1891, Buskirk married Alice Allen, and they had three children: Allen, Lawrence, Jr., and Martha.

He was a thirty-third degree Mason, having held the Indiana's second highest position of grand king of the Grand Chapter of Royal Arch Masons and heir to commercial property in Bloomington.

He died at his home on November 21, 1910 and his funeral was held at Indiana University.

Notes

References

Further reading
 
 

1867 births
1910 deaths
American bank presidents
Indiana Republicans
Indiana University Bloomington alumni
Mayors of Bloomington, Indiana
Masonic Grand Masters
University of Michigan Law School alumni
19th-century American businesspeople